The 8th Pennsylvania Cavalry (89th Volunteers) was a cavalry regiment that served in the Union Army during the American Civil War.

Service
The 8th Pennsylvania Cavalry was organized at Philadelphia, Pennsylvania beginning in August 1861 as the "89th Volunteers" and mustered in for three years service under the command of Colonel Ernest G. Chorman.

The regiment was attached to Porter's Division, Army of the Potomac, to March 1862. Unattached, IV Corps, Army of the Potomac, to April 1862. Blake's Brigade, Cavalry Reserve, Army of the Potomac, to July 1862. 2nd Brigade, Stoneman's Cavalry Division, Army of the Potomac, to September 1862. 2nd Brigade, Pleasanton's Cavalry Division, Army of the Potomac, to February 1863. 2nd Brigade, 1st Division, Cavalry Corps, Army of the Potomac, to June 1863. 2nd Brigade, 2nd Division, Cavalry Corps, Army of the Potomac, to July 1865.

The 8th Pennsylvania Cavalry ceased to exist on July 24, 1865, when it was consolidated with the 16th Pennsylvania Cavalry.

Detailed service

1861-1862
Left Pennsylvania for Washington, D.C., October 4, 1861. Duty at Arlington Heights, Va., defenses of Washington, D.C., until March 1862. Advance on Manassas, Va., March 10-15. Moved to the Virginia Peninsula April. Siege of Yorktown April 11-May 4. Baltimore Cross Roads, near New Kent Court House, May 13. Operations about Bottom's Bridge May 20-23. Reconnaissance toward Richmond and to Turkey Island Creek Bridge May 23. Savage Station May 24. Reconnaissance to Seven Pines May 24-27. Chickahominy May 24. Garnett's Farm and White Oak May 27. Battle of Fair Oaks (Seven Pines) May 31-June 1. Reconnaissance to White Oak Swamp June 22-23. Seven days before Richmond June 25-July 1. Bottom's Bridge June 28-29. Savage Station June 29. Malvern Hill July 1. At Harrison's Landing until August 16. (Company A at the Headquarters of Gen. Porter; Company B at the Headquarters of Gen. McClellan; Company D at the Headquarters of Gen. P. St. G. Cooke.) Turkey Island Bridge July 20. Reconnaissance to Malvern Hill July 23. Retreat from the Peninsula and movement to Alexandria. Maryland Campaign September. Falls Church September 3-4. Sugar Loaf Mountain September 10-11. Frederick September 12. Middletown September 13. Battle of Antietam September 16-17. Boteller's Ford, Sharpsburg, Md., September 19. Shepherdstown Ford September 19. Amissville September 30. Reconnaissance from Sharpsburg to Shepherdstown and Martinsburg, W. Va., October 1 (3 companies). Philomont November 1-2. Castleman's Ferry, Upperville, Union, and Bloomfield November 2-3. Aldie and Ashby's Gap November 3. Markham Station November 4. Barbee's Cross Roads November 5. Waterloo Bridge November 7. Hazel River November 8. Newby's Cross Roads, near Amissville, November 10. Philomont November 19. Leed's Ferry and King George Court House December 2. Battle of Fredericksburg December 12-15.

1863
Chancellorsville Campaign April 27-May 6. 1863. Richard's Ford and Barnett's Ford April 29. Ely's Ford Road April 30. Chancellorsville May 1-2. Salem Heights and Banks' Ford May 4. Aldie June 17. Middleburg June 19. Upperville June 21. Thoroughfare Gap June 25. Westminster, Md., June 30. Battle of Gettysburg July 1-3. Monterey Gap July 4. Smithsburg July 5. Williamsport and Hagerstown, Md., July 6. Boonsboro July 8. Jones' Cross Roads, near Williamsport, July 10 and 13. Hagerstown July 10-13. St. James College July 11-12. Williamsport Road July 14. Shepherdstown July 16. Rixey's Ford September 2. Advance from the Rappahannock to the Rapidan September 13-17. Culpeper Court House September 13. Rapidan Station September 15-16. Robertson's River September 22. Bristoe Campaign October 9-22. Near Warrenton October 11. Warrenton or White Sulphur Springs October 12. Auburn and Bristoe October 14. St. Stephen's Church October 14. Advance to line of the Rappahannock November 7-8. Mine Run Campaign November 26-December 2. New Hope Church November 27. Blind Ferry December 5. Raid to Luray Valley December 21-23. Regiment reenlisted December 31, 1863.

1864
Raid through Chester Gap January 1-4, 1864. Rapidan Campaign May-June 1864. Todd's Tavern May 5-8. Spotsylvania Court House May 8-21. Sheridan's Raid to James River May 9-24. Matapony Church May 9. North Anna River May 9-10. Ground Squirrel Church and Yellow Tavern May 11. Brook Church or Fortifications of Richmond May 12. Haxall's Landing May 18. Line of the Pamunkey May 26-28. Battle of Totopotomoy Creek May 28-31. Haw's Shop May 28. Cold Harbor May 31-June 1. Sumner's Upper Bridge June 2. Sheridan's Trevillian Raid June 7-24. Trevillian Station June 11-12. White House or St. Peter's Church June 21. Black Creek or Tunstall Station June 21. St. Mary's Church June 24. Siege of Petersburg and Richmond June 1864 to April 1865. Warwick Swamp July 12. Charles City Cross Roads July 15-16. Demonstration north of the James River at Deep Bottom July 27-29. Malvern Hill July 28. Warwick Swamp July 30. Demonstration north of the James River at Deep Bottom August 13-20. Gravel Hill August 14. Strawberry Plains and Deep Run August 14-18. Charles City Cross Roads August 16. Dinwiddie Road, near Ream's Station, August 23. Ream's Station August 25. Belcher's Mills September. 17. Poplar Springs Church September 29-October 2. Arthur's Swamp September 30-October 1. Boydton Plank Road, Hatcher's Run, October 27-28. Reconnaissance to Stony Creek November 7. Stony Creek Station December 1. Bellefield Raid December 7-12.

1865
Dabney's Mills, Hatcher's Run, February 5-7, 1865. Appomattox Campaign March 28-April 9. Dinwiddie Court House March 30-31. Five Forks April 1. Paine's Cross Roads and Amelia Springs April 5. Battle of Sailor's Creek April 6. Farmville April 7. Appomattox Court House April 9. Surrender of Lee and his army. Expedition to Danville April 23-29. Duty at Lynchburg and in the Department of Virginia until July.

Casualties
The regiment lost a total of 188 men during service; 5 officers and 55 enlisted men killed or mortally wounded, 2 officers and 126 enlisted men died of disease.

Commanders
 Colonel Ernest G. Chorman - resigned January 1862
 Colonel David McMurtrie Gregg - promoted to brigadier general November 29, 1862
 Colonel Pennock Huey - captured at Saint Mary's Church June 24, 1864; returned to the regiment after parole on December 9, 1864. Promoted to brevet brigadier general March 13, 1865.
 Brevet Colonel Samuel Wilson - discharged October 17, 1864
 Colonel William A. Corrie - commanded the regiment during the Battle of Gettysburg while still at the rank of captain
 Lieutenant Colonel Amos E. Griffiths - commanded at the Battle of Fredericksburg
 Captain Peter Keenan - commanded at the Battle of Antietam

Notable members
 Commissary Sergeant John Galloway - Medal of Honor recipient for action at the Battle of Cumberland Church
 Private John M. Vanderslice, Company D - Medal of Honor recipient for action at the Battle of Hatcher's Run

See also

 List of Pennsylvania Civil War regiments
 Pennsylvania in the American Civil War

References
 Carpenter, James Edward. A List of the Battles, Engagements, Actions and Important Skirmishes in Which the Eighth Pennsylvania Cavalry Participated During the War of 1861-1865 (Philadelphia: Allen, Lane & Scott's Print. House), 1886.
 Ceremonies at Dedication of Monument of the Eighth Penna. Cavalry Regiment at Gettysburg, September 1, 1890: With Historical Sketch of the Regiment (S.l.: s.n.), 1890.
 Dyer, Frederick H.  A Compendium of the War of the Rebellion (Des Moines, IA:  Dyer Pub. Co.), 1908.
 Huey, Pennock. A True History of the Charge of the Eighth Pennsylvania Cavalry at Chancellorsville (Philadelphia: Porter & Coates), 1883.
Attribution

External links
 8th Pennsylvania Cavalry monument at Gettysburg

Military units and formations established in 1861
Military units and formations disestablished in 1865
Units and formations of the Union Army from Pennsylvania
1861 establishments in Pennsylvania